Bennett Masinga (13 January 1965 – 14 November 2013) was a South African footballer who played as a striker.

He was the cousin of former footballer Phil Masinga.

Masinga died on 14 November 2013 at the age of 48.

International career
He was on the score sheet with his cousin in one of Bafana Bafana's first international matches in a 2–2 draw against Cameroon on 11 July 1992. His fifth and last international match was against Mauritius on 10 April 1993.

Style of play
MTN described Masinga as one of the best near post goalscorers in SA football, a tiny man, quick as lightning and able to sniff out a goal in any situation.

Death
Masinga died at the age of 48 after a short illness. Condolences flooded in for the Masinga family. Former Mamelodi Sundowns teammate Zane Moosa took to Twitter to mourn with his tweet reading "Eish, what a sad way to start the weekend. The passing of Bennett "Loverboy" Masinga, what a player! Robala ka kgostso Bennito". Phil Masinga also said "I idolised him. Followed him around as a youngster. Carried his boots for him just to see him play. All I wanted was to be as good in football as he was. No doubt he was a better player than me."

Career statistics

International goals

See also

 List of African association football families

References

External links
 

1965 births
2013 deaths
South African soccer players
South Africa international soccer players
Association football forwards
Mamelodi Sundowns F.C. players
People from Klerksdorp
Bloemfontein Celtic F.C. players
Hellenic F.C. players
Santos F.C. (South Africa) players